Alsleben is a town in the district of Salzlandkreis, in Saxony-Anhalt, Germany. It is situated on the river Saale, south of Bernburg. It is part of the Verbandsgemeinde ("collective municipality") Saale-Wipper.

Personality

Sons and daughters of the town 

 Fritz Schaper (1841–1919), sculptor and professor, creator of the relief in the gable of the Reichstags
 Johann Friedrich Ahlfeld (1843–1929), gynecologist
 Wolfgang Herrmann (1904–1945), Nazi librarian

Personalities who have lived or live in Alsleben 

 Werner Kriesel (born 1941), engineer, professor of automation technology in Leipzig and Merseburg, a pioneer of industrial communication technology
 Johann Friedrich Ahlfeld (theologian)

References

Towns in Saxony-Anhalt
Salzlandkreis